Männlichen is a classic men's World Cup slalom ski course 
in Wengen, Switzerland. Located in the Bernese Alps on Lauberhorn mountain, the course made its debut in 1930.

It is the oldest active alpine ski racing course in the world and part of the Lauberhornrennen, the oldest ski competition in the world.

As Switzerland is and always was militarily neutral, alpine competitions were held during World War II.

Männlichen shares a common finish area with "Lauberhorn", Wengen's famous downhill course.

(pre)World Cup

Men

Official course name 
In 2020, the name of the course was officially changed (shortened) from "Männlichen / Jungfrau" to "Männlichen" only. It is named after the mountain of the same name in the surrounding area.

Club5+ 
In 1986, elite Club5 was originally founded by prestigious classic downhill organizers: Kitzbühel, Wengen, Garmisch, Val d’Isère and Val Gardena/Gröden, with goal to bring alpine ski sport on the highest levels possible.

Later over the years other classic longterm organizers joined the now named Club5+: Alta Badia, Cortina, Kranjska Gora, Maribor, Lake Louise, Schladming, Adelboden, Kvitfjell, St. Moritz, and Åre.

References

External links

Skiing in Switzerland